Bill Griffin is widely known as a musician in both bluegrass and Hawaiian music genres. A luthier and veteran mandolinist, he is also the inventor of the "mandolele", which is a nylon-stringed mandolin that he first crafted in 1986. Born in Glendale, California, Griffin's first exposure to music came through his father, a pianist in a Dixieland jazz band. Griffin began playing ukulele at age five, guitar soon thereafter, and mandolin at age nineteen. He also plays piano and bass.

Luthier Work and Mandolele 

The foundation of Griffin's work as a luthier began in 1970 when he began working for C. Bruno and Sons, the largest musical instrument wholesale company in the world at that time. While there, he met and began apprenticing under master luthier David Simpson. As a result of learning the trade of luthier, Griffin constructed several instruments of his own design, including the mandocaster (an electric mandolin that he built in 1978) and the mandolele, which he first built in 1986. As for the original motivation for building these instruments, Griffin says that "If I couldn't buy it, I'd build it."  Upon settling in the Sacramento area in 2012, Griffin started his own business building the mandolele.

The mandolele is a nylon-stringed mandolin with four strings rather than eight. Griffin built it to achieve the soft tone characteristic of nylon-stringed instruments such as the ukulele, combined with the tuning and feel of an F5 mandolin. The tuning is the same as that of an F5, as is the scale length and overall feel of the instrument.  Griffin stated that the idea behind the mandolele is that "mandolin players can enter new musical ground with the instrument."  Griffin's use of it has primarily been in Hawaiian music. He says that "It inspires me to play differently simply because the tone is not what you'd expect from a mandolin."

The Cache Valley Drifters 

The Cache Valley Drifters, now composed of Griffin on mandolin, Wally Barnick on bass, and Mike Mullins on guitar, have been a fixture of the California bluegrass scene since their formation in 1972.  The band was based out of Santa Barbara, and have appeared at festivals throughout the United States and Europe.  They met folk singer Kate Wolf in 1974, worked as her backing band on her 1977 album "Lines on the Paper," and occasionally performed as her backup band for live performances.

The Cache Valley Drifters recorded three albums for Flying Fish Records between 1979 and 1983. After a seven-year hiatus, they reformed in 1992.  They went on to start their own label, "Mighty Fine Records."  To date, they continue to record and to tour.  Their live performances include an annual Sunday morning concert at the Live Oak Music Festival.

Collaborations with Kate Wolf 

Griffin met folk music icon Kate Wolf in 1974, and their professional collaborations began when she used the Cache Valley Drifters as her backup band on her 1977 release "Lines on the Paper."  Afterward, Griffin worked with Wolf independently as producer and arranger on several of her albums, including "Poet's Heart" which won an award in 1986 for Folk Album of the Year from NAIRD (National Association of Independent Record Distributors).  Kate Wolf died in 1986.

Hawai`i 

Griffin moved to Hawai`i in 2006. He soon began working at Kanile`a `Ukulele, where he became manager and master luthier. He built his second iteration of the mandolele while in Hawai`i, and became a noted figure in the Hawaiian music scene, playing with such artists as Keale, Kawika Kahiapo, LT Smooth, Patrick Landeza, and Ernie Cruz, Sr. He also became a member of the Saloon Pilots, a Hawai`i-based Americana band, playing mandolin and bass.  While in Hawai`i, he met singer Yvonne Elliman and became part of her band for her 2011 performances at the Cotton Club in Tokyo, Japan. Griffin moved back to California in 2012, but continues to play and record with Hawai`i-based artists.

Selected Discography 

With The Cache Valley Drifters:

 1979   Cache Valley Drifters - Flying Fish Records
 1980   Step Up To Big Pay - Flying Fish Records
 1983   Tools of the Trade - Flying Fish Records
 1996   White Room - C.M.H. Records
 1999   Mightfine.net - Mighty Fine Records (U.S.)/Taxim (Germany)
 2000   Stolen Roses: Songs of the Grateful Dead (Track number one, "Cumberland Blues") - Grateful Dead Records
 2000   Bluegrass Then and Now - C.M.H. Records
 2012   CVD Live in Germany - Mighty Fine Records

With Kate Wolf:

 1977   Lines on the Paper (member of the Cache Valley Drifters, backing band)
 1979   Safe at Anchor (producer, arranger, musician)
 1981   Close to You (producer, arranger, musician)
 1983   Give Yourself to Love (musician)
 1985   Poet's Heart (producer, arranger, musician)
 1986   Gold in California (producer, arranger, musician)
 1988   The Wind Blows Wild (musician)
 1994   Looking Back at You (producer)
 2000   Weaver of Visions (producer, arranger, musician)

Other Musical Appearances:

 1984   Out of the Darkness with Don Lange
 1988   Songs of the Working People
 1989   The Phil Salazar Band (producer)
 2004   In The Hills Of California by Greg Brown
 2008   The White Bathtub by Kenneth Makuakane 
 2009   Kawelona by Keale 
 2009   Imprint by Kapala 
 2011   Kama`alua by Patrick Landeza 
 2012   The Saloon Pilots by The Saloon Pilots 
 2012   The Blinding Speed of Trust by The Piranha Brothers Band
 2014   Motherland Aina Kaula by Keale
 2017   Slade Rivers and Friends by Slade Rivers
 2018   Lei Lehua by Mark Yamanaka
 2018   Cobblestone by Hanale Bishop

References 

 Kanile`a `Ukulele
 Bill Griffin, AllMusic

American mandolinists
Living people
Year of birth missing (living people)
Musicians from Glendale, California